is a Japanese professional footballer who plays as a left midfielder for Lausanne-Sport.

Career

Youth at Cerezo Osaka
After playing in the youth teams of Cerezo Osaka, he joined the reserve club playing in J3 League. He made 3 appearances throughout the season 2017 as a substitute and played 11 minutes. He joined the Nagasaki Institute of Applied Science in March 2018.

Shonan Bellmare
In the end of the 2018 season, Shonan Bellmare signed Suzuki for the upcoming 2019 season. He made his debut for the club on March 6 in a J.League Cup group stage match against V-Varen Nagasaki. 3 days later, he made his J1 debut in a 1-0 loss against Kashima Antlers. Suzuki scored his first professional goal in the away J.League Cup match against V-Varen Nagasaki in a 1-0 win.

Lausanne-Sport
On 13 January 2021, Suzuku joined Swiss Super League club FC Lausanne-Sport.

References

External links

2000 births
Living people
Association football people from Osaka Prefecture
Japanese footballers
Japan youth international footballers
Association football midfielders
Cerezo Osaka players
Cerezo Osaka U-23 players
Shonan Bellmare players
FC Lausanne-Sport players
J1 League players
J3 League players
Japanese expatriate footballers
Expatriate footballers in Switzerland
Japanese expatriate sportspeople in Switzerland
Japan under-20 international footballers